Britt Bongaerts (born ) is a Dutch volleyball player. She is part of the Netherlands women's national volleyball team.

She participated in the 2014 FIVB Volleyball World Grand Prix.
On club level she played for Eurosped TVT in 2014.

References

External links
 Profile at FIVB.org

1996 births
Living people
Dutch women's volleyball players
People from Roermond
Sportspeople from Limburg (Netherlands)